The Division of Page is an Australian electoral division in the state of New South Wales.

History

The division is named after the Right Honourable Sir Earle Page, the second leader of the Country Party of Australia and the Prime Minister of Australia after the death of Joseph Lyons in 1939. The division was proclaimed at the redistribution of 11 October 1984, and was first contested at the 1984 federal election.

Since its creation, Page has usually been a marginal seat, frequently changing hands between the National Party and the Labor Party, with neither party gaining more than 55% of the two party preferred vote at any election except for the 1984 election, the 2019 election and the 2022 Australian federal election . It was considered a bellwether seat from the 1990 election until 2022, when it was comfortably won by the National Party, despite the victory of the Labor Party under Anthony Albanese. Though results vary by election, booths in the City of Lismore LGA are usually Labor’s strongest results, while the more rural booths generally deliver strong votes for the Nationals candidate.

It was previously held by Ian Causley, the Deputy Speaker of the Australian House of Representatives. Causley retired at the 2007 election, and Chris Gulaptis, a former Mayor of Maclean, was endorsed as the Nationals' candidate. Labor selected Janelle Saffin, a former member of the New South Wales Legislative Council, who took the seat with a swing of around 8 per cent. Saffin increased her majority in 2010, however was defeated in 2013 by the Nationals' Kevin Hogan, who won with a swing of 6.71 per cent. 

Hogan moved to the crossbench in 2018 in protest over the spate of leadership spills in the Liberal Party. However, he still supported the Coalition on confidence and supply, and remained a National in good standing. He rejoined the Coalition before the 2019 election and contested that as a Nationals endorsed candidate.

Boundaries
Since 1984, federal electoral division boundaries in Australia have been determined at redistributions by a redistribution committee appointed by the Australian Electoral Commission. Redistributions occur for the boundaries of divisions in a particular state, and they occur every seven years, or sooner if a state's representation entitlement changes or when divisions of a state are malapportioned.

The division is located in the far north-east of the state, adjoining the border with Queensland and the Tasman Sea. It includes the towns of Lismore, Casino, Grafton, Tyringham, Bonalbo, Nimbin, Yamba and Iluka. Originally, much of its current territory (including Page's home of Grafton) was located in neighbouring Cowper, which Page represented from 1919 to 1961. In February 2016, Page's borders were extended as far south as Sapphire Beach.

Members

Election results

References

External links
Division of Page - Australian Electoral Commission

Electoral divisions of Australia
Constituencies established in 1984
1984 establishments in Australia